The Advocate-General of Bengal was charged with advising the Government of the British administered Bengal Presidency on legal matters. The Presidency existed from 1765 to 1947. Prior to 1858, when it was administered by the East India Company, the Advocate-General was the senior law officer of that company but was also the Attorney-General of the Sovereign of Great Britain.

List of Advocates-General of Bengal
East India Company
Sir John Day 1780– 
Thomas Henry Davies 1786–?1792 
Sir William Burroughs, Bt 1792–1801 
Edward Strettell ?1803–c.1816
Robert Cutlar Fergusson (acting) c.1817
Robert Spankie 1817–?1823
Robert Cutlar Fergusson 1823–
John Pearson 1824–1840 
(Sir) Lawrence Peel 1840–1842  (afterwards Chief Justice of Bengal, 1842)
John Edwardes Lyall 1842–?1845  (died of cholera, 1845)
Sir James William Colvile 1845–1848  (later Chief Justice of Bengal, 1855)
William Ritchie 1855–1861 
Government of the United Kingdom
Thomas Hardwick Cowie 1862–1870 
Joseph Graham 1870–1873 
Sir Gregory Charles Paul 1873–1899 
Frederick Joseph Patton 1878 (acting)
Sir Gruffydd Humphrey Pugh Evans 1895 (acting)
James Tisdall Woodroffe 1899–1904
Lewis Pugh Pugh 1900–
Peter O'Kinealy 1904– 
Satyendra Prasanna Sinha 1908–1909 
George Harry Blair Kenrick 1909–1916 
Satyendra Prasanna Sinha 1916
Thomas Clark Pilling Gibbons 1917–1923 
Satish Ranjan Das 1922–  
Sir Brojendra Lai Mitter 1925–1928 
Sir Nripendra Nath Sircar 1928–1934 
Sir Asoka Kumar Roy 1934–1943 
Sudhansu Mohan Bose c.1946

References

Bengal
1780 establishments in the British Empire